The Woodchopper Roadhouse, on the Yukon River, is a historic establishment that was built in approximately 1910. It is located in the Yukon-Charley Rivers National Preserve. It served as a hotel and as a post office.  Its log building was listed on the National Register of Historic Places in 1987.

The two-story approximately  building is built from approximately  logs, peeled but not hewn.  It is "the largest and oldest log structure on the Yukon between Eagle and Circle", and in fact is located halfway between, so it has served as a stopover point.  For example, the Biedermmans of Ed Biederman Fish Camp used it as a stopover for dog sledding the mail up and down the frozen Yukon River.  The site was also a steamboat stop, in the summer.

See also
National Register of Historic Places listings in Yukon-Charley Rivers National Preserve
National Register of Historic Places listings in Yukon–Koyukuk Census Area, Alaska

References

External links

Buildings and structures completed in 1910
National Register of Historic Places in Yukon-Charley Rivers National Preserve
Hotel buildings on the National Register of Historic Places in Alaska
Yukon River
Buildings and structures on the National Register of Historic Places in Yukon–Koyukuk Census Area, Alaska
Log buildings and structures on the National Register of Historic Places in Alaska
1910 establishments in Alaska